All Eyez on Me is the fourth studio album by American rapper 2Pac and the last to be released during his lifetime. Released on February 13, 1996, by Death Row and Interscope Records, the album features guest appearances from Dr. Dre, Snoop Doggy Dogg, Redman, Method Man, Nate Dogg, Kurupt, Daz Dillinger, E-40, K-Ci & JoJo, and the Outlawz, among others.

The album features productions by Shakur alongside a variety of producers including DJ Quik, Johnny "J", Dr. Dre, DJ Bobcat, Dat Nigga Daz, DJ Pooh, DeVante Swing, among others. It was the only Death Row/Interscope release that was distributed through PolyGram in the United States.

A gangsta rap album, 2Pac raps about his experiences of living in poverty and in luxury; critics particularly note that 2Pac widely diverges from the social and political consciousness of 2Pacalypse Now (1991) and Strictly 4 My N.I.G.G.A.Z... (1993). The album includes the Billboard Hot 100 number-one singles "How Do U Want It" (featuring K-Ci and JoJo) and "California Love" (with Dr. Dre, featuring Roger Troutman) and the hip-hop ballad "I Ain't Mad at Cha", along with the Snoop Doggy Dogg collaboration "2 of Amerikaz Most Wanted" as a promotional single. It featured four singles in all, the most of any of Shakur's albums. Moreover, All Eyez on Me made history as the first ever double-full-length hip-hop solo studio album released for mass consumption globally.

All Eyez on Me was the second album by 2Pac to chart at number one on both the Billboard 200 and the Top R&B/Hip-Hop Albums charts, selling 566,000 copies in the first week. Seven months later, 2Pac was fatally wounded  in a drive-by shooting. The album won the 1997 Soul Train Music Award for Rap Album of the Year posthumously, and was also posthumously nominated for Best Rap Album at the 39th Grammy Awards in 1997. Shakur also won the award for Favorite Rap/Hip-Hop Artist at the American Music Awards of 1997.

Upon release, All Eyez on Me received instant critical acclaim,  and it has been ranked by critics as one of the greatest hip hop albums, as well as one of the greatest albums of all time. It was certified Diamond by the Recording Industry Association of America (RIAA) in 2014, with shipments of over 5 million copies (each disc in the double album counted as a separate unit for certification), and in 2020 was ranked 436th on Rolling Stone's updated list of the 500 Greatest Albums of All Time.

Background
In October 1995, Suge Knight and Jimmy Iovine paid the $1.4 million bail necessary to get Shakur released from jail on charges of sexual abuse. At the time, Shakur was broke and thus unable to make bail himself. All Eyez on Me was released following an agreement between Knight and Shakur which stated Shakur would make three albums under Death Row Records in return for them paying his bail. Fulfilling part of Shakur's brand new contract, this double-album served as the first two albums of his three-album contract.
 
Euthanasia was the initial title of the album until it was changed to All Eyez on Me during the recording process. Shakur explained to MTV's Bill Bellamy in December 1995 saying: 

All Eyez on Me was originally intended for a Christmas 1995 release but was pushed back as Shakur continued to record music and shoot music videos for the album.

Recording and production
The album features guest spots from 2Pac's regulars, such as former-Thug Life members and The Outlawz, as well as Dr. Dre, Snoop Doggy Dogg, Tha Dogg Pound, Nate Dogg, George Clinton, Rappin' 4-Tay, The Click, Method Man, and Redman among others. The song "Heartz of Men" samples a portion of Richard Pryor's comedy album That Nigger's Crazy. Most of the album was produced by Johnny "J" and Daz Dillinger, with help from Dr. Dre on the songs "California Love", which he himself appeared in also as an album guest spot, and "Can't C Me", which was Clinton's appearance. DJ Quik also produced, mixed and made an appearance on the album, but had to use his real name on the credits because his contract with Profile Records prevented him from using his stage name.

Lyrical themes
The songs on All Eyez on Me are, in general, unapologetic celebrations of living the "Thug Lifestyle". Though there is the occasional reminiscence about past and present friends, it is a definite move away from the social and political consciousness of 2Pacalypse Now and Strictly 4 My N.I.G.G.A.Z.... The songs on the album along with the name of the album itself, allude to the feeling of being watched. With songs like "Can't C Me" and "All Eyez on Me", 2Pac makes it known that he feels the presence of surveillance, most notably by the police. The album also references the fact that 2Pac is under the attention of many fans, being his fourth studio album.

Singles
The first single, "California Love" featuring Dr. Dre and Roger Troutman was released, December 3, 1995. This is perhaps 2Pac's best-known song and his most successful, reaching number one on the Billboard Hot 100 for eight weeks (as a double A-side single with "How Do U Want It") and 12 weeks at number one in New Zealand. The song was nominated for a Grammy Award for Best Rap Performance by a Duo or Group (with Dr. Dre and Roger Troutman) in 1997. A remix version also produced by Dr. Dre appeared on the album. The song has since been certified 2× platinum by the Recording Industry Association of America.

"2 of Amerikaz Most Wanted" featuring rapper Snoop Doggy Dogg, was released as a promotional single on, May 7, 1996. The video was directed by one of 2Pac's production partners, Gobi M. Rahimi and was filmed four months prior to the September 1996 shooting of 2Pac. The prelude for the song shows a parody of Biggie Smalls ("Piggie") and Puff Daddy ("Buff Daddy") in discussion with Shakur about the November 1994 shooting. The beginning of the scene where Tupac is speaking to Biggie is in reference to the scene in the film Scarface in which Tony Montana speaks to his alleged killer before shooting him. The song peaked at number 46 on the US Billboard Hot R&B/Hip-Hop Airplay chart.

The second single, "How Do U Want It" featuring R&B duo K-Ci & JoJo, was released, June 4, 1996. It was paired with "California Love" as a double A-side single, with 2 of Amerikaz Most Wanted and the non-album track, Hit 'Em Up serving as the B-sides. The song reached number one on the Billboard Hot 100. There were three videos filmed for the song: two in the same set for the single in April 1996. The video was directed by Ron Hightower and produced by Tracy D. Robinson. These two are distinguished by MPAA rating (one is certified adult material). The video portrays a wild sex party with Jacuzzi, mechanical bull riding, cage dancing and pole stripping. All actors and actresses are dressed in Renaissance-era costumes, though all clothes are removed for the nude clip. The adult-material video also features numerous porn stars, including Nina Hartley, Heather Hunter, and Angel Kelly. The limousine segment seen in the clean version is the same except no nudity. The third one is the concert version, mostly them performing on stage. There are cameo appearances by K-Ci & JoJo, and fellow group member of Digital Underground Shock G both in the concert and studio segments.

"I Ain't Mad at Cha" featuring singer Danny Boy, was released in Europe and parts of Oceania shortly after Shakur's death as the final single from the album, on September 15, 1996. For the video the song was re-recorded with a live band. The new track was recorded at Can-Am Studios by Conley Abrams. The video was shot weeks before Shakur's death.

Critical reception
{{Album ratings
| rev1 = AllMusic
| rev1score = 
| rev2 = Encyclopedia of Popular Music
| rev2score = 
| rev3 = Entertainment Weekly
| rev3score = B+
| rev4 = Los Angeles Times
| rev4score = 
| rev5 = NME
| rev5score = 9/10
| rev6 = Pitchfork
| rev6score = 9.4/10
| rev7 = Q
| rev7score = 
| rev8 = The Source (2010)
| rev8Score = 5/5 
| rev9 = Rolling Stone
| rev9score = 
| rev10 = The Rolling Stone Album Guide
| rev10score = 
| rev11 = Spin
| rev11score = 7/10
| rev12 = USA Today
| rev12Score = 
| rev13 = XXL 
| rev13Score = 5/5 
}}All Eyez on Me received widespread critical acclaim. Spin magazine gave it 7 out of 10 and said: "As long as you don't expect philanthropy from Tupac, you'll find honesty and some pleasurably twisted scenarios." The record ranked No. 3 on Entertainment Weeklys list of Top 10 albums of 1996. AllMusic stated, "Maybe it was his time in prison, or maybe it was simply his signing with Suge Knight's Death Row label. Whatever the case, 2Pac re-emerged hardened and hungry with All Eyez on Me, the first double-disc album of original material in hip-hop history. With all the controversy surrounding him, 2Pac seemingly wanted to throw down a monumental epic whose sheer scope would make it an achievement of itself. But more than that, it's also an unabashed embrace of the gangsta lifestyle, backing off the sober self-recognition of Me Against the World. Sure, there are a few reflective numbers and dead-homiez tributes, but they're much more romanticized this time around. Despite some undeniable filler, it is easily the best production 2Pac's ever had on record".

In the Los Angeles Times, Cheo Hodari Coker praised the album: "All Eyez on Me, a 27-song, 133-minute gangster's paradise, finds the rapper even more venomous than he was before his 11-month incarceration for sexual abuse. He displays no remorse for his tough life, and even less feeling for his enemies. The only thing jail time did for 2Pac was make his creative fires burn even hotter—he raps here with a passion and skill matched in gangsta rap only by Snoop Doggy Dogg and the Notorious B.I.G. And with such producers as DJ Pooh, DJ Quik, Dr. Dre and Johnny J laying down the tracks, he finally has a musical team worthy of his talent."

Jon Pareles of the New York Times considered the album typical gangsta-rap fare, but with superior production.  "Standard images of ghetto desperation turn up...but far more of 2Pac's rhymes are about living in luxury: driving a plush car, drinking cognac, smoking weed and having all the women he wants."  Pareles notes that, "while 2Pac used to show some sympathy for women, he has returned to hard-line gangsta machismo, with women as either gold-digging 'bitches' or heavy-breathing, pliant 'hos'." The Guardian gave the album two stars out of five, declaring it "one of these angry recriminatory discs would have been more than enough, thanks." finding that "too much of the two hours is consumed by self-justifying rants like Only God Can Judge Me and Skandalouz." The review concluded that "There is some delicious g-funk here [...] but 2Pac's attitude sours the whole thing."

"It's like a Cali thug-life version of Pink Floyd's The Wall – pure gangsta ego run amok over two CDs," complained Rolling Stone. "At that length, the album's all-hard-all-the-time tone approaches caricature." Nonetheless, the album was included in the magazine's essential recordings of the 1990s.

Accolades
 The information regarding accolades attributed to All Eyez on Me is adapted from Acclaimed Music.
 Asterisk (*) signifies unordered lists.

Commercial performanceAll Eyez on Me debuted at number-one on both the US Billboard 200 and the US Top R&B/Hip-Hop Albums charts, selling 566,000 copies in its first week, becoming 2Pac's second number one album on the chart. The album was eventually certified diamond by the Recording Industry Association of America (RIAA). As of September 2011, All Eyez on Me has sold 5,887,630 in the United States, making it 2Pac's highest-selling album. It has charted on the Billboard 200 for 105 weeks in total.

In the United Kingdom, the British Phonographic Industry certified the album silver on January 1, 1997, followed by gold on July 22, 2013, and platinum on November 14, 2014, for sales of over 300,000 copies in the United Kingdom.

It was re-released in 2001 as enhanced CDs containing the "California Love" music video. Both discs contained the same data track. It was also re-released as a Dual-Disc in 2005.

Lawsuit
Civil rights activist and fierce rap critic C. Delores Tucker sued 2Pac's estate in federal court, claiming that lyrics in "How Do U Want It" and "Wonda Why They Call U Bitch" inflicted emotional distress, were slanderous, and invaded her privacy.  The case was later dismissed.

Track listing
 Track listing adapted from the album booklet

Notes
 "All Bout U" features additional vocals from Hussein Fatal and Yaki Kadafi
 "Life Goes On" features vocals from Stacey Smallie and Nanci Fletcher.
 "California Love (Remix)" features background vocals from Barbara Wilson, Nanci Fletcher, and Danette Williams. The full original version can only be found on promo vinyl versions.
 "Can't C Me" features additional vocals from Nanci Fletcher
 "Got My Mind Made Up" originally was a Dogg Pound song featuring Wu-Tang Clan member Inspectah Deck, The Lady Of Rage & RBX, but their vocals were removed when Daz gave 2Pac the song for his album.
 "Wonder Why They Call U Bytch" originally featured former Bad Boy Records singer Faith Evans, but her vocals were replaced.
 "Check Out Time" features background vocals from Natasha Walker.
 "Ratha Be Ya Nigga" features background vocals from Stacey Smallie.

Leftover and extra tracks
Most of the songs on the list were remixed on posthumous 2Pac albums Still I Rise, Until the End of Time, Better Dayz and Pac’s Life.
 "All About U (Solo Video Version)" featuring Nate Dogg
 "Ambitionz Az A Fighta (Mike Tyson Mix)"
 "Better Dayz"
 "Come With Me (Interlude)" feat. Danny Boy
 "Da Struggle Continuez" feat. Hussein Fatal, O.F.T.B. & Big Syke
 "Don't Fall Asleep (Original Version)" feat. Daz Dillinger, E.D.I. Mean, Hussein Fatal & Kastro
 "Don't Stop The Music (Original Version)" feat. E.D.I. Mean, Hussein Fatal & Nanci Fletcher
 "You Can't (Fade Me)" feat. Jewell, Kastro & Napoleon
 "Fair Xchange (Original Version)" feat. Tyrone Wrice & Cappucine Jackson
 "Fuck Em All (Original Version)" feat. E.D.I. Mean, Kastro & Napoleon
 "Give Me Love" feat. 6 Feet Deep
 "Good Life" feat. Big Syke & E.D.I. Mean
 "Komradz" feat. E.D.I. Mean, Kastro, Mussolini, Napoleon & Storm
 "Late Night" feat. DJ Quik & AMG
 "Letter 2 My Unborn (Original Version)" feat. Natasha Walker
 "Ma Babiez Mama" featuring Yaki Kadafi
 "M.O.B. (Original Version)" feat. Big Syke, Hussein Fatal, Mopreme Shakur & Yaki Kadafi
 "Penitentiary Bound" feat. Dramacydal & Mopreme Shakur
 "R U Still Smiling For Me?"
 "Secretz Of War (Original Version)" feat. Hussein Fatal, Kurupt & Yaki Kadafi
 "Soon As I Get Home" feat. Yaki Kadafi
 "Still Ballin (Original Version)" feat. Kurupt
 "Still I Rise (Original Version)" feat. Big Syke, Hussein Fatal & Yaki Kadafi
 "There U Go (Original Version)" feat. Big Syke, Kastro & Yaki Kadafi
 "The: Thugz"
 "U Can Call (Original Version)"
 "What'z Next (Original Version)" feat. Mopreme Shakur, Big Syke, Prince Ital Joe & Natasha Walker
 "When I Get Free III (Original Version)"
 "Where U Been" feat. Danny Boy, Hussein Fatal, Napoleon & Big Syke

Sample credits

Ambitionz az a Ridah
 "Pee-Wee's Dance" performed by Joeski Love

All Bout U
 "Candy" performed by Cameo

Got My Mind Made Up
 "I Got My Mind Made Up (You Can Get It Girl)" performed by Instant Funk
 "Sucker M.C.'s" performed by Run–D.M.C.
 "Eric B. is President" performed by Eric B. & Rakim

How Do U Want It
 "Body Heat" performed by Quincy Jones

2 of Amerikaz Most Wanted
 "The Message" performed by Grandmaster Flash and the Furious Five
 Radio Activity Rapp (Let's Jam)" performed by MC Frosty and Lovin' C
 "The Posse (Shoot 'Em Up)" performed by Intelligent Hoodlum

No More Pain
 "Bring the Pain" performed by Method Man

Heartz of Men
 "Darling Nikki" performed by Prince and The Revolution
 "Mudbone - Intro" performed by Richard Pryor
 "Up for the Down Stroke" performed by Parliament
 "You're Gettin' a Little Too Smart" performed by The Detroit Emeralds
 "The Back Down" performed by Richard Pryor
 "Nigger With a Seizure" performed by Richard Pryor
 "Jim Brown" performed by Richard Pryor

Life Goes On 
 "Brandy" performed by The O'Jays

Only God Can Judge Me
 "Top Billin' performed by Audio Two

Tradin' War Stories
 "Too Little in Common" performed by Randy Brown

California Love (Remix)
 "So Ruff, So Tuff" performed by Roger Troutman
 "Intimate Connection" performed by Kleeer 
 "Woman to Woman" by Joe Cocker
 "West Coast Poplock" performed by Ronnie Hudson and The Street People
 "Dance Floor" performed by Zapp

I Ain't Mad at Cha
 "A Dream" performed by DeBarge

What'z Ya Phone #
 "777-9311" performed by The Time

Can't C Me
 "(Not Just) Knee Deep" performed by Funkadelic
 "I'm Only Out for One Thang" performed by Ice Cube
 "Get Off My Dick and Tell Yo Bitch to Come Here" performed by Ice Cube
 "What's My Name" performed by Snoop Dogg 
 "Shake, Rattle and Roll" performed by Big Joe Turner

Shorty Wanna Be a Thug
 "Wildflower" performed by Hank Crawford

When We Ride
 "What Would You Do" performed by Tha Dogg Pound

Thug Passion
 "Computer Love" performed by Zapp & Roger

Picture Me Rollin'
 "Winter Sadness" performed by Kool & the Gang 
 "Better Off" performed by Johnny "J"

Check Out Time
 "Candy Rain" performed by Soul for Real
 "Just Don't Bite It" performed by N.W.A

Ratha Be Ya Nigga
 "I'd Rather Be with You" performed by Bootsy Collins

All Eyez on Me
 "Never Gonna Stop" performed by Linda Clifford

Run tha Streetz 
 "Piece of My Love" performed by Guy

Heaven Ain't Hard 2 Find
 "What You Won't Do for Love" performed by Bobby Caldwell

Personnel
Credits for All Eyez on Me'' adapted from AllMusic and CD booklet.

 2Pac – associate producer, composer, producer, vocals
 Suge Knight – executive producer
 Norris Anderson – production manager
 Delmar "Daz" Arnaud – composer
 Dave Aron – engineer, mixing
 Big Syke – vocals
 Larry Blackmon – composer
 David Blake – composer, mixing, producer, talk box
 B-Legit – vocals
 Bobcat – composer
 Calvin Broadus – composer
 R. Brown – composer
 C-BO – vocals
 Larry Chatman – associate producer
 Rick Clifford – engineer
 G. Clinton, Jr. – composer
 George Clinton – composer, vocals 
 Nanci Fletcher – vocals
 Dorothy Coleman – background vocals
 W. Collins – composer
 Kenn Cox – composer
 CPO – vocals
 Woody Cunningham – composer
 Tommy D. Daugherty – engineer
 Danny Boy – vocals
 Dat Nigga Daz – producer, vocals
 Robert Diggs – composer
 DJ Pooh – composer, mixing, producer
 Dr. Dre – composer, mixing, producer, vocals
 Tha Dogg Pound – vocals
 Nate Dogg – vocals
 Dramacydal – vocals
 Dru Down – vocals
 Norman Durham – composer
 E-40 – vocals
 Ebony – background vocals
 Bobby Ervin – composer, producer
 Fatal – vocals
 Brian Gardner – mastering
 Michael Geiser – associate engineer
 Yaki Kadafi – vocals
 Nathaniel Hale – composer
 C. Haskins – composer
 Johnny Jackson – composer
 Jewell – vocals
 Johnny "J" – mixing, producer
 Puff Johnson – background vocals
 Jojo the Elf – vocals
 E. Jordan – composer
 Kurupt – vocals
 Alvin McGill – associate engineer, engineer
 Method Man – vocals
 Michel'le – vocals
 Mike Mosley – assistant engineer, composer, mixing, producer
 Nanci Fletcher – vocals
 Shirley Murdock – composer
 Ken Nahoum – photography
 Outlawz – vocals
 J.P. Pennington – composer
 Prince – composer
 George Pryce – art direction, design
 QD3 – composer
 Rappin' 4-Tay – vocals
 Doug Rasheed – composer, producer
 Danny Ray – background vocals
 Redman – vocals
 Richie Rich – vocals
 Rick Rock – producer
 Patrick Shevelin – associate engineer
 Carl "Butch" Small – percussion
 Stacey Smallie – background vocals
 C. Smith – composer
 Henry "Hendogg" Smith – illustrations
 Snoop Doggy Dogg – vocals
 Troy Staton – engineer
 D. Stevens – composer
 E. Stevens – composer
 D. Stewart – composer
 The Storm – vocals
 DeVanté Swing – composer, mixing, producer
 Roy Tesfay – production co-ordination
 Rahiem Prince Thomas – composer
 S. Thomas – composer
 Sean "Barney" Thomas – keyboards
 Larry Troutman – composer
 Roger Troutman – composer, vocals, talk box
 Natasha Walker – background vocals
 Carlos Warlick – engineer, mixing
 Barbara Warren – stylist, unknown contributor role
 Bruce Washington – composer
 Danette Williams – background vocals
 Barbara Wilson – background vocals
 Nanci Fletcher – background vocals
 Keston Wright – engineer

Charts

Weekly charts

Year-end charts

Decade-end charts

Certifications

See also
 Tupac Shakur discography
 List of number-one albums of 1996 (U.S.)
 List of number-one R&B albums of 1996 (U.S.)
 List of best-selling albums in the United States

Notes

References

External links
 
 
 

1996 albums
Albums produced by Daz Dillinger
Albums produced by Dr. Dre
Albums produced by DJ Pooh
Albums produced by Rick Rock
Death Row Records albums
Interscope Records albums
Tupac Shakur albums
Albums produced by DJ Quik
G-funk albums